Thomas Watts may refer to:

 Thomas H. Watts (1819–1892), Democratic Governor of the U.S. state of Alabama from 1863 to 1865, during the Civil War
 Thomas Watts (1868–1951) (1868–1951), British Conservative Party Member of Parliament
 Thomas Watts (1689–1742) (died 1742), English Member of Parliament, academy master and leading figure at the Sun Fire Office
 Thomas Watts (cricketer) (1899–1976), English first-class cricketer for Surrey

See also
Thomas Watt (disambiguation)